Nothing But the Truth is the fourth album by American singer Mac McAnally, released in 1983 on Geffen Records.

The album failed to chart. "Minimum Love" narrowly missed the Top 40 on the Billboard Hot 100, peaking at No. 41. However, it was a Top 10 Adult Contemporary hit in the Adult Contemporary chart.

Content and history
McAnally wrote the songs for the album over the course of two years. During this timespan, he also became a father for the first time, and his own father died as well. Keith Tuber of Orange Coast thought that the album reflected a theme of "compromise" given McAnally's life experiencesleading up to its release. He also thought that it had a "fuller" sound than McAnally's previous works.

Track listing
All songs are written by Mac McAnally, except where noted.

Personnel
Mac McAnally – lead vocals, guitar, keyboards, bass
David Hood – bass
David Hungate – bass
James Stroud – drums
Roger Hawkins – drums
Hugh McCracken – guitar
John Willis – guitar
Duncan Cameron – guitar
Kenny Mims – guitar
Tom Roady – percussion
Clayton Ivey – keyboards
Brandon Barnes – synthesizer
Steve Nathan – synthesizer
Randall Bramblett – horns
Lenny LeBlanc – backing vocals
Mike Cunningham – backing vocals
Robert Byrne – backing vocals
Sarah McAnally – backing vocals
Terry Woodford – backing vocals

Production
Clayton Ivey, Terry Woodford – production
Terry Woodford, Steve Melton, Alan Schulman, Lee Daley, Mary Beth McLemore – engineering

Charts
Singles

References

External links

1983 albums
Geffen Records albums
Mac McAnally albums